A blue sign or blue board is used by inland waterways vessels within the Trans-European Inland Waterway network when performing a special manoeuvre or passing on the starboard side.  On navigable waterways vessels normally pass each other on the port-side, so the display of the blue sign and flashing white light signal intention to pass each other on the starboard-side. This process is known as blue boarding or historically blue flagging.

The  (CEVNI) regulations require upstream vessels operating on the opposite side to display a light-blue sign and scintillating (flashing) white light. Article 3.03 states that the board must be rectangular and 1-metre × 1-metre for large vessels, or 0.6-metres × 0.6-metres for small vessels.

The presence and status of the blue sign is transmitted by the ship's Inland-Automatic Identification System (Inland-AIS) transponder to other vessels. The status of the sign is transmitted using two bits of the "regional application flags"/"special manoeuvre field" in the AIS position reports. This must be transmitted every ten seconds.

References

External links

Water transport in Europe
Nautical terminology
Maritime education